Julian Gaines (born November 5, 2002) is an American professional soccer player who plays as a right-back for Major League Soccer club Los Angeles FC.

Club career

Los Angeles FC
On August 19, 2021, Gaines joined Major League Soccer club Los Angeles FC. Gaines was signed through the MLS Waiver Order, with Los Angeles FC trading $50,000 in General Allocation Money and the 21st spot in the Waiver Order to Toronto FC to acquire the number one spot.

On March 11, 2022, Gaines was loaned to Las Vegas Lights FC.

Career statistics

Club

References

External links
 Profile at USL Championship

2002 births
Living people
Soccer players from Austin, Texas
American soccer players
Association football defenders
Austin Bold FC players
Las Vegas Lights FC players
Los Angeles FC players
USL Championship players
United States men's youth international soccer players